Mariyka Ivanova Popova (1866–1940) was a Bulgarian actor. She is often referred to as the first professional actress in Bulgaria.

Biography 

Mariyka Popova was born in Ruse, Bulgaria in 1866, and finished her elementary education in Ruse. Afterwards, she relocated to Plovdiv with her parents and studied at the Plovdiv Girls' High School. After the Rumelia theatrical troupe was founded in 1883, she was also invited to join as a member.

Popova made her debut in "Robstvoto na mazhete". She then broke away from her education and entirely dedicated herself to the theater. After the Bulgarian unification in 1885, the troupe re-established its activity. In 1888, she joined the theatre "Osnova" and later became a member of the Drama department of the Sofia troupe in the theatre "Salza i Smyah". She also performed in the National Theatre Ivan Vazov after its founding. 

Mariyka Popova passed away in Sofia on 23 December 1940.

Major Theater Roles 

The most significant among many roles in Mariyka Popova's career are:

 Klotilda "Kamenodeletsa" of Alexandre Dumas
 Marya Anonovna "Revizor" of Nikolai Gogol
 Agafya Tihovna – "Zhenitba" of Nikolai Gogol
 Ruska – "Ruska" – of Ivan Vazov
 Evgeni – "Hashove" of Ivan Vazov
 Ms. Terziyska – "Sluzhbogontsi" of Ivan Vazov

References

1866 births
1940 deaths
Bulgarian actresses